Queen of the Isles was a passenger ferry built for the Isles of Scilly Steamship Company in 1964 by Charles Hill & Sons. She was designed to carry passengers and cargo between Penzance, Cornwall, UK, to the offshore Isles of Scilly, complementing the service provided by the other company ship Scillonian.  After running her for the service between Penzance and Scilly from 1964 to 1966, the Isles of Scilly Steamship Company put Queen of the Isles  on a range of brief charters, including with P & A Campbell, before selling her in 1970.

From 1970 to 1982 she operated as Olovaha in Tonga and from 1982 to 1987 as Gulf Explorer as a casino ship in Australian waters. She was renamed Queen of the Isles II in 1987 when cruising off the Great Barrier Reef. Renamed Island Princess in 1992 and Western Queen in 1994, she ran aground at Ranadi beach, Honiara, in the Solomon Islands around 2001. In 2010 the hull was cut away to the waterline, the remainder still left there.

References

External links
 

Ferries of the United Kingdom
Water transport in Cornwall
Transport in the Isles of Scilly
1964 ships
Ships built in Bristol